Ifenakaren is a place in the region of Tiznit, owned by the family of Afnakar who have many lands there and it is named by their own family name "Afnakar". Ifenakaren means ""the" Afnakar".

Ifenakarn is located in 29°24'59"n   9°44'14"w.

Ifenakaren is known also for its argan oil and olive oil which has a good quality.

The Map Of Ifenakaren

Populated places in Tiznit Province